Alison Braden (born November 26, 1982 in Calgary) is a female water polo player from Canada. While attending California State University, Long Beach, she lettered on the women's water polo team from 2003–2005, having played 92 games and recorded 96 career assists. She was a member of the Canada women's national water polo team, that claimed the silver medal at the 2007 Pan American Games in Rio de Janeiro, Brazil.

References 

1982 births
Living people
Canadian female water polo players
Sportspeople from Calgary
California State University, Long Beach alumni
Long Beach State Beach women's water polo players
Water polo players at the 2007 Pan American Games
Pan American Games silver medalists for Canada
Pan American Games medalists in water polo
Medalists at the 2007 Pan American Games